Mary Flaherty is a fictional character from the BBC soap opera EastEnders, played by Melanie Clark Pullen, from 22 September, 1997 to 23 February, 1999. Her first appearance is in a special week of episodes set in Ireland, first broadcast in 1997.

Storylines
The fictional character Mary is the granddaughter of Maggie Flaherty (Olivia Shanley), Pauline Fowler's (Wendy Richard) long-lost sister. Her father is Conor (Seán Gleeson), but she doesn't get on with him. When the Fowlers go to Ireland to meet their relatives, Mary is a teenager in trouble. Although she is shown to have a level head on her shoulders, she is having an affair with an older married man, Gerry McCrae (Simon O'Gorman). Mary finds a good friend in her cousin Mark (Todd Carty), and decides to move Walford, and their relationship improves over time.

Pauline initially likes Mary, often remarking that she is like a younger version of her mother, but they cannot live in the same house and Mary often has to find new accommodations. Mary also comes between couple Joe Wicks (Paul Nicholls) and Sarah Hills (Daniela Denby-Ashe), but Joe returns to Sarah after they have a one-night stand, breaking her heart.

Mary breaks her pelvis whilst on holiday in Norfolk and then gets involved with Matthew Rose (Joe Absolom) and Robbie Jackson (Dean Gaffney), before leaving Walford with her father, Conor, and his pregnant lover, Mark's wife Ruth Fowler (Caroline Paterson).

Creation and development
It was announced in July, 1997 that Pauline Fowler's (Wendy Richard) long lost family were to be introduced into EastEnders. Melanie Clark Pullen secured the role and made her first appearance on 22 September, 1997. There were hints that the character would move to Albert Square in the future, which is what ultimately happened. Richie Taylor of the Daily Mirror said "It will be a huge break for Melanie, 23, who finished college only earlier this year and will make her screen debut in the series."

In November, 2000, Clark Pullen revealed that becoming a celebrity sent her "spiraling into depression". She said "The whole thing terrified the life out of me. It was a real baptism of fire and quite unnerving. I didn't quite know what I was letting myself in for. Coming from Blackrock, near Dublin, I just didn't realise what an obsession EastEnders is over in England. I found it extremely difficult adjusting to London. I didn't know my way around, but everyone knew me. I would ask the way to Marks & Spencers and get: 'Oh, my God—it's Mary off the telly'. 'And I'd get 16-year-old boys going: 'Hello Mary, I'll show you a good time'. I started to suffer panic attacks and felt increasingly isolated. It was worse coming straight from Ireland." She added that it was scary because Ireland and England have different senses of humour.

References

External links

EastEnders characters
Fictional bartenders
Television characters introduced in 1997
Fictional Irish people
Female characters in television
Beale family (EastEnders)